The 1905–06 season was the 33rd season of competitive football in Scotland and the 16th season of the Scottish Football League..

League competitions

Scottish League Division One

Champions: Celtic

Scottish League Division Two

Next season there are eighteen teams in Division One and twelve teams in Division Two.

Other honours

Cup honours

National

County

Non-league honours

Senior 
Highland League

Other Leagues

Scotland national team

Scotland were joint winners of the 1906 British Home Championship with England.

Key:
 (H) = Home match
 (A) = Away match
 BHC = British Home Championship

Other national teams

Scottish League XI

See also
1905–06 Aberdeen F.C. season
1905–06 Rangers F.C. season

Notes

References

External links
Scottish Football Historical Archive

 
Seasons in Scottish football